BR-146 is a federal highway of Brazil. The 678.7 kilometre road connects Patos de Minas, Minas Gerais to Guarulhos, São Paulo.

References

Federal highways in Brazil